Leroy Carter (born 24 February 1999 in New Zealand) is a New Zealand rugby union player who plays for the  in Super Rugby. His playing position is scrum-half. He has signed for the Chiefs wider training squad in 2020.

Carter was named in the All Blacks Sevens squad for the 2022 Commonwealth Games in Birmingham. He won a bronze medal at the event.

Reference list

External links
itsrugby.co.uk profile

1999 births
New Zealand rugby union players
Living people
Rugby union scrum-halves
Rugby union wings
Bay of Plenty rugby union players
Chiefs (rugby union) players
Rugby union players from Tauranga
Rugby sevens players at the 2022 Commonwealth Games
Commonwealth Games bronze medallists for New Zealand
Commonwealth Games medallists in rugby sevens
Medallists at the 2022 Commonwealth Games